Gábor Delneky (29 May 1932 – 26 October 2008) was a Hungarian fencer won a gold medal in the team sabre event at the 1960 Summer Olympics.

Delneky lost his parents at early age – his mother died when he was 10, and his father was placed in a military labor camp when he was 13. Delneky turned to sports and studies, and after graduating in civil engineering became the head of the engineering department at Viziterv, a Hungarian engineering firm. In 1969, he immigrated through Italy to the United States. There he received a master's degree in engineering at the University of Wisconsin at Milwaukee, and continued his engineering education in Florida and Illinois. He eventually became an American citizen and died in Florida, aged 76.

References

External links
 

1932 births
2008 deaths
Hungarian male sabre fencers
Olympic fencers of Hungary
Fencers at the 1960 Summer Olympics
Olympic gold medalists for Hungary
Martial artists from Budapest
Olympic medalists in fencing
Medalists at the 1960 Summer Olympics
20th-century Hungarian people